Hampstead & Highgate was a parliamentary constituency covering the northern half of the London Borough of Camden which includes the village of Hampstead and part of that of Highgate.

It was abolished in the 2010 general election; with the majority forming the new constituency of Hampstead and Kilburn; and part to the Holborn and St Pancras seat. The 2023 review of the Boundary Commissions proposes to re-establish the seat in its revised proposal.

History

Some areas here were amongst the wealthiest in the UK, but the seat always had an intellectual, artistic middle-class vote associated with the intelligentsia (see main page on Hampstead). It also contained Kilburn, with its large Irish community. The Labour incumbent in Hampstead and Highgate at the time of abolition, Glenda Jackson, retained the new constituency of Hampstead and Kilburn in 2010 with a majority of just 42.

Boundaries
1983–1997: The London Borough of Camden wards of Adelaide, Belsize, Fitzjohns, Fortune Green, Frognal, Hampstead Town, Highgate, Kilburn, Priory, South End, Swiss Cottage, and West End.

1997–2010: The London Borough of Camden wards of Adelaide, Belsize, Fitzjohns, Fortune Green, Frognal, Gospel Oak, Hampstead Town, Highgate, Kilburn, Priory, South End, Swiss Cottage, and West End.

In 2002, a Local Government Boundary Commission for England review abolished the Adelaide, Priory, South End and West End wards, whilst it combined Frognal and Fitzjohns into one ward. For the 2005 general election, the electoral wards used in this constituency were Belsize, Camden Town with Primrose Hill (part), Fortune Green, Frognal and Fitzjohns, Gospel Oak (part), Hampstead Town, Haverstock (part), Highgate (part), Kilburn, Swiss Cottage and West Hampstead.

Following their review of parliamentary representation in North London, the Boundary Commission for England created a new constituency of Hampstead and Kilburn by excluding Highgate ward (which became part of Holborn & St Pancras) and including three wards from the neighbouring borough of Brent. Hampstead and Kilburn largely replaced Hampstead and Highgate for the 2010 general election.

Members of Parliament

Elections

Elections in the 1980s

Elections in the 1990s

Elections in the 2000s

See also 
 List of parliamentary constituencies in London

References

Politics of the London Borough of Camden
Constituencies of the Parliament of the United Kingdom established in 1983
Constituencies of the Parliament of the United Kingdom disestablished in 2010
Parliamentary constituencies in London (historic)
Hampstead
Highgate